Thomas Nasca is an American nephrologist who is the incumbent chief executive officer of the Accreditation Council for Graduate Medical Education (ACGME).

Early life and education 
Nasca graduated from the University of Notre Dame. For his medical education, he went to the Jefferson Medical College and completed his education in 1975. He completed his residency from UPMC Mercy. Later, he did his fellowship in nephrology from Brown University and Rhode Island Hospital.

Career 
In 1992, Nasca became vice chairman of medicine department of Jefferson Medical College and Thomas Jefferson University Hospital. Later, he became an associate dean of the Jefferson Health System.

In July 2000, he became acting dean of Jefferson Medical College. In January 2001, he was formally appointed as a dean of Jefferson Medical College.

In December 2007, he left the deanship and became president of the Accreditation Council for Graduate Medical Education.

In 2010, he was included in Modern Healthcare’s 50 most influential clinical executives list.

Bibliography
 Spandorfer, John; Pohl, Charles A.; Rattner, Susan L.; Nasca, Thomas J. (1 September 2009) Professionalism in Medicine: A Case-Based Guide for Medical Students, Cambridge University Press.

References

External links
 Thomas Nasca Interview

American nephrologists
Living people
Year of birth missing (living people)